Liu Peixuan (born 7 November 1992) is a Chinese badminton player from Changsha, Hunan. He was selected to join national junior team competed at the 2009 Asian Junior Championships, winning two silver medals in the mixed doubles and team event. Liu later competed at the World Junior Championships, helped the team clinch the mixed team title, and won the bronze medal in the mixed doubles event. He won the senior international title at the 2010 India Grand Prix in the mixed doubles event partnered with Tang Jinhua.

Achievements

BWF World Junior Championships 
Mixed doubles

Asian Junior Championships 
Mixed doubles

BWF Grand Prix 
The BWF Grand Prix had two levels, the BWF Grand Prix and Grand Prix Gold. It was a series of badminton tournaments sanctioned by the Badminton World Federation (BWF) which was held from 2007 to 2017.

Mixed doubles

  BWF Grand Prix Gold tournament
  BWF Grand Prix tournament

References

External links 
 

1992 births
Living people
Sportspeople from Changsha
Badminton players from Hunan
Chinese male badminton players